Aubert Côté (March 22, 1880 – March 27, 1938) was a Canadian wrestler who competed in the 1908 Summer Olympics. He was born in Montreal. In 1908 he won the bronze medal in the freestyle bantamweight category. He earned Canada's first olympic bronze medal in wrestling when he defeated Frank Davis  of Great Britain in the first round. He eventually lost to gold medalist George Mehnert from the United States. After that he went on to beat Frederick Tomkins from Great Britain earning his spot in third place.

After the Olympics  
He later moved to Montana in the United States where he became a state champion in the 125-pound class. After this he moved again to Utah where he settled down and worked as a wrestling coach at Brigham Young University until his death in March of 1938.

References

External links
profile
https://olympics.com/en/athletes/aubert-cote#b2p-athlete-olympic-results

1880 births
1938 deaths
Olympic wrestlers of Canada
Wrestlers at the 1908 Summer Olympics
Canadian male sport wrestlers
Olympic bronze medalists for Canada
Sportspeople from Montreal
Olympic medalists in wrestling
Medalists at the 1908 Summer Olympics
French Quebecers
20th-century Canadian people